mallasser

  is a village in Pathanamthitta district in the state of Kerala, India. Located on the route from Konni to Kumbazha via Attachackal, Konnithazham is known for its secular harmony of people. 

Rich with religious centres, Konni-Thazham houses churches belonging to Malankara Orthodox, Malankara Catholic, Roman Catholic, Malankara Marthomite and Pentecost. Sacred grooves are also seen in some areas. Iravon village office is also present here.  

Iravon Village office, Konni Thazham LP school or Idayath School etc. are the main administrative-educational institutions in the area.

Demographics
 India census, Konnithazham had a population of 14666 with 6962 males and 7704 females.

References

Villages in Pathanamthitta district